SGEF (Src homology 3 domain-containing Guanine nucleotide Exchange Factor) is a 97 kDa protein involved in intracellular signalling networks. It functions as a guanine nucleotide exchange factor (GEF) for RhoG,  a small G protein of the Rho family.

Discovery
SGEF was discovered during a screen for androgen-responsive genes in human prostate cancer cells. Subsequent northern blot analysis revealed expression of SGEF in tissues of the heart, brain, placenta, lung, liver, kidney, pancreas, prostate, testis, small intestine and colon. SGEF is also expressed in endothelial cells of the vasculature. Several widely used cell lines express this protein, these include A431, HeLa, HUT78, HEK-293, Jurkat, THP, PC12, RAJI, U937 and Meg-01.
SGEF was identified to contribute to the formation of atherosclerosis through promoting endothelial docking structures that resulted in retention of leukocytes at athero-prone sites of inflammation. Genetic variants in SGEF have been associated with coronary artery disease

Structure and function
SGEF is part of a large class of proteins (GEFs) that function to activate small G proteins. In their resting state G proteins are bound to guanosine diphosphate (GDP) and their activation requires the dissociation of GDP and binding of guanosine triphosphate (GTP). GEFs activate G proteins by promoting nucleotide exchange.

SGEF has the canonical GEF structure of tandem DH and PH domains, which elicit nucleotide exchange and, in addition, contains an N-terminal proline-rich motif and a C-terminal SH3 domain. Proline regions and SH3 domains often mediate recruitment and binding to adaptor proteins suggesting that SGEF is probably involved in the formation of heteromultimeric protein complexes.

Regulation of activity
Data from several studies suggest that SGEF is regulated by its recruitment to transmembrane receptor-linked adaptor proteins via its SH3 domain. In one study, mutation of the SH3 domain disrupted SGEF-dependent functions in NIH-3T3 fibroblasts. In endothelial cells SGEF was recruited to the intracellular domain of the transmembrane adhesion molecule ICAM-1 upon leukocyte adhesion to the endothelium.

References